H. G. Wells' The War of the Worlds (a.k.a. The Classic War of the Worlds or just War of the Worlds) is the first of three reworked direct-to-video film versions, first appearing in 2005, that adapts H. G. Wells's 1898 novel of the same name about a Martian invasion of southern England. This version, noted for its faithfulness to Wells's novel, was produced by the independent film company Pendragon Pictures. Unlike the adaptations set in the current day United States, this was the first film set in the novel's original 1898 Victorian England.

Plot
The early part of the film follows the experience of a late 19th-century journalist from Woking, known as "the writer", involved with the landing of a Martian invasion spacecraft. When the crashed cylinder opens, the Martians start killing anything that moves with a "heat ray" weapon. The writer discovers his house is in range of their heat ray and decides to rush his wife and servant to her cousins' home in Leatherhead; once there, he returns in order to return the borrowed cart to its owner, unaware that the invading Martians are now on the move.

The Martians have built tall tripod "fighting machines" and begun a destructive rampage across southern England. The film also details the adventures of his brother, a student in London, who accompanies two ladies to the east coast of England in order to escape from the slaughter and destruction wrought by the Martians.

When the writer tries to get back to his wife in Leatherhead, he is confounded and beset by many problems as a result of the chaos brought by the Martian invasion.

Cast

Anthony Piana as The Writer/The Brother
Jack Clay as Ogilvy
John Kaufmann as The Curate
Darlene Sellers as Mrs. Elphinstone
James Lathrop as The Artilleryman
Susan Goforth as The Wife
Jamie Lynn Sease as Miss Elphinstone

Production
The film's development dates back to 2000, when Pendragon Pictures approached Paramount with plans for a remake, but nothing came of it. Director Timothy Hines had long desired to make his own version of Well's novel since first reading the original at aged eight. He had always wanted to set the tale in-period, but he eventually settled on a modern retelling, much like the original 1953 film and the 2005 Spielberg adaptation. Hines' version was to be set in Seattle, with a Martian attack preceded by neutralizing electromagnetic power; from there the tale's events would unfold and be as similar as possible to Wells' novel.

In a 2004 interview with Scifidimensions.com, Hines stated that after early Microsoft employees and others in the computer industry saw his desktop film, Bug Wars, a package of $42 million was assembled for the updated modern version. Katie Tomlinson was supposed to lead the cast as the lead character Jody, the foreign correspondent, and Susan Goforth was also set to star. Hines was also planning to shoot the film using the brand new Sony CineAlta HD system, which George Lucas had used to film Star Wars: Episode II – Attack of the Clones.

Production began in early September 2001, with plans to move into principal photography by October of that year, with a Halloween 2002 target release date. Businessweek reported that Hines abandoned this approach after the World Trade Center attacks. Two weeks later, with the support of Charles Keller, the director of the H. G. Wells Society, Hines began writing a new script with producer Susan Goforth, while they were filming Pendragon's Chrome. The new direction taken would be to directly adapt the Wells novel, setting it in its original British setting and 1898 time period.

Little information appeared about the film until 2004, when it was announced that principal photography had finished under the cover title The Great Boer War. The producers planned to release the film on March 30, 2005, but that date came and went with no theatrical release; in North America it finally was released as a direct-to-DVD feature in June 2005. In a series of questions presented by audiences, Hines claimed that the film never saw a theatrical release due to exhibitors pulling out, either from being bullied by Paramount, or through fear of reprisal from the studio.

The 2005 book War of the Worlds: From Wells to Spielberg devotes a chapter to the Pendragon film; it states that the budget was "approximately $25 million."

Director Hines said of his film: "I wanted to make War of the Worlds. But what I made was something that has a macabre cult following, like an Ed Wood movie. [...] I’ve learned a lot since my first outing. My heart is really in the new War of the Worlds – The True Story."

Dark Horse

In July 2006 Pendragon Pictures announced in a press release that the Dark Horse Comics H.G. Wells' The War of the Worlds comic possessed visual similarities to Pendragon's film; Pendragon set up a website poll showing image comparisons. In April 2008 Pendragon publicly announced the legal settlement of the matter, stating it "apologizes for any misconception its press release or later internet poll may have caused".

Reception

Although the film's score by Jamie Hall was well received, reviewers noted that the film felt very similar to the films of Ed Wood and the worst films lampooned on Mystery Science Theater 3000. One reviewer, however, suggested the performances were like that in British period melodramas, and favorably likened the work to that of Karel Zeman.
But the film as a whole received generally poor reviews by critics, who, while often praising the good intentions behind the project and its faithfulness to the source material, variously described the result as "unendurable" and "terrible in almost every way a movie can be", with "awful" effects.

Re-releases
To date the film has two variant versions re-released on home video in 17 countries, including Japan:

H.G. Wells' The War of the Worlds: Director's Cut
Released: September 2005. Reviewers complained about the film's original three-hour running time, and this version was cut by about forty-five minutes; it was available on video in regions 2 and 4, but not in region 1, the United States and Canada.

The Classic War of the Worlds
Released: December 25, 2006. This edition is the special final cut edit of H. G. Wells' The War of the Worlds and is 125 minutes long, fifty-five minutes shorter than the original. It has added scenes, re-edits, and re-tooled special effects; the director says this is the definitive version. The Classic War of the Worlds replaces the 3 hour rough cut version, H.G. Wells' The War of the Worlds, that was widely distributed and is now discontinued.

War of the Worlds – The True Story

In 2012 a re-imagined, re-edited, and re-thought version, with new material added, was released under the title War of the Worlds – The True Story; this new version, again directed by Timothy Hines, is presented as a faux-documentary. It revisits Wells' novel, portraying its events as historical by way of the documented recollections of a survivor of the Martian invasion.

The film bases its approach on the 1938 Orson Welles CBS radio Halloween broadcast of War of the Worlds, by presenting itself as a true account of actual events.  Director Timothy Hines said, in reference to this technique, "When Orson Welles broadcast War of the Worlds on the radio in the late 1930s, he presented it in such a way as to not clearly identify that it was a work of fiction. He did it for the drama. And many people mistook the fictional news broadcast as a real news broadcast. People believed they were hearing an actual invasion from Mars that night. We are approaching the story in the same way, as if it were an actual news documentary".

See also
H. G. Wells' War of the Worlds, also titled Invasion or The Worlds in War, another direct-to-DVD film adaptation, produced by The Asylum.
The Great Martian War: 1913-1917 an original made-for-television Canadian/UK produced science fiction docudrama, first aired in 2013 on the History Channel UK during the first year of the World War I centenary. It was then shown in the United States the following year. The telefilm adapts H. G. Wells 1898 novel of the same name, this time transplanting the Martian invasion to 1913 and instead of southern England, all of western Europe.

References

External links
WOTW

H.G. Wells' The War of the Worlds Official site.
H.G. Wells' The War of the Worlds. News Repository
Advertisement. Variety. Ad placed by Pendragon Pictures in 2001.

"War of the Worlds - update. Since events of 11 September..." Dowse.com. Tony Lee, 1991. Pre- and post-9/11 info.

The True Story

 

2005 films
Alien invasions in films
Direct-to-video science fiction films
2005 science fiction films
American science fiction war films
American independent films
Films based on The War of the Worlds
Films set in England
Films set in the 1890s
2000s English-language films
2000s American films